Elden is a given name and surname.  Notable people with the name include:

Given name
Elden Auker (1910–2006), American baseball player
Elden C. Bailey (1922–2004), American percussionist
Elden Benge (1904–1960), American trumpeter
Elden Campbell (born 1968), American basketball player
Elden Francis Curtiss (born 1932),  American prelate of the Roman Catholic Church
Elden Henson (born 1977), American actor
Elden H. Johnson (1921–1944), United States Army soldier
Elden Kingston (1909–1948),  American founder of Davis County

Surname
Bård Jørgen Elden (born 1968), Norwegian nordic combined skier
John Christian Elden (born 1967), Norwegian barrister and politician
Marte Elden (born 1986), Norwegian cross-country skier 
Trond Einar Elden (born 1970), Norwegian Nordic combined skier

See also
Eldin (disambiguation), include list of people with name Eldin
Eldon (given name)
Eldon (surname)